Angel's Choice is a 2012 South Korean television series starring Choi Jung-yoon, Yoon Hee-seok, Jung Sung-woon and Go Na-eun. The morning soap opera aired on MBC from April 2 to October 12, 2012, on Mondays to Fridays at 07:50 (KST) for 140 episodes.

Plot

Cast

Main
Choi Jung-yoon as Choi Eun-seol
Yoon Hee-seok as Park Sang-ho
Jung Sung-woon as Wang Min-jae / Kang Min-jae
Go Na-eun as Kang Yoo-ran / Kang Min-soo

Supporting

Choi Eun-seol's family
Choi Il-hwa as Choi Ji-hak
Jang Hee-soo as Jang Soon-ok
Chu Hun-yub as Choi Eun-suk

Wang Min-jae's family
Lee Jung-gil as Wang Gook-hyun
Oh Mi-yeon as Han Pil-nyeo

Park Sang-ho's family
Heo Yoon-jung as Heo Young-ja
Kang Ye-seo as Yoo-ran and Sang-ho's daughter

Kang Yoo-ran's family
Kim Dong-joo as Yang Mal-soon
Jung Soo-young as Kang Yoo-mi

Extended cast
Kim Min-jwa as Oh Soo-jung
 Seo Bum-suk as Bae Dal-bong
 Yang Jae-sung as Chairman Oh
 Choi Jung-hwa as Lee Jung-ah
Kwon Sung-hyun as Lee Myung-jin, an attorney
 Kang Chul-sung as Secretary Kim

References

External links
 
 

2010s South Korean television series
MBC TV television dramas
2012 South Korean television series endings
Korean-language television shows
South Korean romance television series
South Korean melodrama television series
Television series by MBC C&I